William M. Bray (March 17, 1880 – March 15, 1964) was a member of the Wisconsin State Assembly and the Wisconsin State Senate.

Biography
Bray was born on March 17, 1880, in Oshkosh, Wisconsin. He attended Northwestern University and Harvard University and became involved in the lumber business.

He died in Klamath Falls, Oregon, on March 15, 1964.

Political career
Bray was a member of the Assembly in 1908. He was elected to the Senate in 1914. He was a Republican.

References

External links
The Political Graveyard

1880 births
1964 deaths
Politicians from Oshkosh, Wisconsin
Republican Party Wisconsin state senators
Republican Party members of the Wisconsin State Assembly
Businesspeople from Wisconsin
Businesspeople in timber
Northwestern University alumni
Harvard University alumni
20th-century American politicians
20th-century American businesspeople